{{Infobox comedian
| name              = Tom Simmons
| image             =
| imagesize         =
| caption           =
| pseudonym         = 
| birth_name        =
| birth_date        = 
| birth_place       = Hicksville, NY
| death_date        =
| death_place       =
| medium            = Comedy
| nationality       = American
| active            =
| genre             =
| subject           =
| influences        =
| influenced        =
| spouse            = Serena Simmons
| domesticpartner   = 
| notable_work      = ''San Francisco International Comedy Competition| signature         =
| website           = www.tomsimmonscomedy.com
| footnotes         =
| current_members   =
| past_members      =
}}Tom Simmons (born February 27) is an American stand-up comedian and nationally touring, comedy-club headliner.

Notable works
In 2009, Simmons won the San Francisco International Comedy Competition.

He has appeared in BET's ComicView, Showtime's White Boyz in the Hood, and Comedy Central's Live at Gotham. He publishes several podcasts: "Bully the Bullies!" and "The End Is Not Near". He is also a guest on other podcasts like "Filter Free Amerika."

Simmons has also released several comedy albums. His CDs include (ONE), Next (ONE), Live at McCurdy's, and Stages. His most recent release on Rooftop Comedy Productions is Keep Up (2010). He has also released a comedy DVD titled Standup Underground.

Personal life
Simmons and his wife Serena live in Greensboro, North Carolina, with their son Owen.

ReferencesSources:'''

External links
Official website
Tom Simmons Radio on Pandora
Tom Simmons at Comedy Central

American male comedians
21st-century American comedians
Living people
People from Hicksville, New York
Year of birth missing (living people)